Bartoli is an Italian surname. Notable people with the surname include:

Adolfo Bartoli (1851–1896), Italian physicist
Alberto Leoncini Bartoli (born 1932), retired Italian diplomat
Alfonso Bartoli (1874–1957), archaeologist, teacher, and Italian politician
Amerigo Bartoli Natinguerra (1890–1971), Italian painter, caricaturist, and writer
Cecilia Bartoli (born 1966), Italian opera singer
Cosimo Bartoli (1503–1572), Italian diplomat, mathematician, philologist, and humanist
Daniello Bartoli (1608–1685), Italian Jesuit writer and historian
Domenico Bartoli (1912–1989), Italian journalist and essayist
Elisa Bartoli (born 1991), Italian football defender
Francesco Bartoli (1745–1806), Italian actor, playwright, and writer
Giovanni Bartoli, 14th-century Italian sculptor and jewelmaker
Giuseppe Bartoli (1717-1788), Italian antiquarian and literary scholar
Jenifer Bartoli (born 1982), French pop singer (part-Corsican extraction)
Julien Bartoli (born 1999), French rugby union football player
Luciano Bartoli (1946–2019), Italian actor
Marion Bartoli (born 1984), French tennis player (Corsican descent)
Massimiliano Bartoli, Italian chef and restaurateur
Matteo Bartoli (1873–1946), Italian linguist
Michele Bartoli (born 1970), Italian cyclist
Petrus Draghi Bartoli (1646–1695), Italian Roman Catholic prelate, Patriarch of Alexandria 
Pietro Santi Bartoli (1615–1700), Italian engraver, draughtsman and painter
Sandro Ivo Bartoli (born 1970), Italian pianist
Sara Bartoli (born c. 1980), known as the "Angel Baby Who Protected the Pope"
Taddeo Bartoli or Taddeo di Bartolo (c. 1363–1422), Italian painter 
Teodora Ricci-Bàrtoli (1750–1806), Italian actress
Vito Andrés Bártoli (1929–2019), Argentine footballer and manager

Fictional characters:
Marco Bartoli, cult leader and the main villain of Tomb Raider II

See also
Bartholdi (surname)

Italian-language surnames
Patronymic surnames
Surnames from given names